Presidential elections were held in El Salvador on 20 February 1972. 

The result was a victory for Arturo Armando Molina of the Party of National Conciliation (PCN), who received 43.4% of the vote. However, the election was characterised by massive fraud. The PCN had faced a strong challenge from left- and right-wing opposition, and as a result had tried to rig the election by holding the presidential elections two weeks before the legislative election (which took place on 12 March) to ensure that if Molina failed to pass the 50% mark, the Legislative Assembly would still be under PCN control to approve him as president. Despite their attempts to stuff ballot boxes, it looked for a while as though José Napoleón Duarte of the opposition National Opposing Union (UNO, a coalition of the Christian Democratic Party National Revolutionary Movement and Nationalist Democratic Union) had been victorious after the Central Election Board in San Salvador issued a statement that Duarte had won by around 6,000 votes. However, this was followed by a three-day news blackout, after which a revised set of figures was announced giving a narrow victory to Molina, meaning that the Legislative Assembly (with a PCN majority) would choose the president. The opposition walked out of the vote, resulting in Molina being elected by 31 votes to zero.

Results

References

Bibliography
Anderson, Thomas P. Politics in Central America: Guatemala, El Salvador, Honduras, and Nicaragua. New York: Praeger. Revised edition. 1988.
Bland, Gary. "Assessing the transition to democracy." Tulchin, Joseph S. with Gary Bland, eds. 1992. Is there a transition to democracy in El Salvador? Boulder: Westview Press (Woodrow Wilson Center current studies on Latin America) 1992. 
Bowdler, George A. Political participation in El Salvador: a statistical analysis of spatial, historico-temporal and socio-economic relationships to voter registration and total votes cast, 1964-1972. University of South Carolina. (Dissertation). 1974.
Caldera T., Hilda. Historia del Partido Demócrata Cristiano de El Salvador. Tegucigalpa: Instituto Centroamericano de Estudios Políticos. 1983.
Eguizábal, Cristina. "El Salvador: elecciones sin democracia." Polemica (Costa Rica) 14/15:16-33 (marzo-junio 1984). 1984.
Haggerty, Richard A., ed. El Salvador, a country study. Washington: Library of Congress, Federal Research Division. 1990.
LeoGrande, William and Carla Anne Robbins. "Oligarchs and officers: the crisis in El Salvador." Foreign affairs 58, 5:1084-1103 (summer 1980). 1980.
Montgomery, Tommie Sue. 1995. Revolution in El Salvador: from civil strife to civil peace. Boulder: Westview.
Political Handbook of the world, 1972. New York, 1973. 
Schooley, Helen. Conflict in Central America. Harlow: Longman. 1987.
Webre, Stephen. José Napoleón Duarte and the Christian Democratic Party in Salvadoran Politics 1960-1972. Baton Rouge: Louisiana State University Press. 1979.
White, Alastair. El Salvador. New York: Praeger Publishers. 1973.

Presidential elections in El Salvador
1972 in El Salvador
El Salvador